A lariat is a rope in the form of a lasso.

Lariat may also refer to:
A rope necklace long enough to loop several times around the neck
Lariat chain, a science demonstration
A genetic structure in RNA splicing
A professional wrestling attack, a move
A trim package for the Ford F-Series
The trade name for Alachlor, a herbicide
The Lariat, a 1927 short novel by Jaime de Angulo
 LArIAT, a particle physics facility in Chicago
LARIAT, a testbed for network security applications